José Manuel García Bedoya was a Peruvian politician in the early 1930s. He was the mayor of Lima from 1932 to 1933.

Mayors of Lima
Year of death missing
Year of birth missing